James Hutchinson Sutter (1818 – 13 April 1903) was a 19th-century member of parliament in Canterbury, New Zealand.

He was Mayor of Timaru from 1875 to 1876 and from 1879 to 1882. He died on 13 April 1903, aged 85.

References

1818 births
1903 deaths
19th-century New Zealand politicians
Mayors of Timaru
Members of the New Zealand House of Representatives
New Zealand MPs for South Island electorates